'Beyond the Blazing Horizon' is the first full EP by the Polish blackened death metal band Crionics.

Track listing

 "Thus The Stars Were Falling (Intro)" - 1:07
 "Episode of the Falling Star" - 4:40
 "Fireland"  - 3:36
 "Waterfalls of Darkness" - 3:48
 "There Was Neither Ground Nor Firmament (Precipice Gaped)" - 4:15
 "Beyond the Blazing Horizon (Outro)" - 1:56

Total playing time 19:26

Bonus tracks
 Mystic Past
 Pagan Strength
 Black Warriors
 I am the Black Wizards (Emperor cover)

Personnel
 Michał "War-A.N" Skotniczny - guitar, vocals
 acław "Vac-V" Borowiec - keyboards, synthesizers
 Maciej "Carol" Zięba - drums
 Bartosz "Bielmo" Bielewicz - guitar
 Marcotic - bass
 B. Bielewicz & G. Sznyterman - engineering, mixing, mastering

External links
 Official Page
 Encyclopaedia Metallum

2007 EPs
Crionics albums

pl:Neuthrone